Rafael Palmero Ramos (27 July 1936 – 8 March 2021) was a Spanish Roman Catholic prelate.

Biography
He was auxiliary bishop of Toledo between 1987 and 1996, bishop of Palencia between 1996 and 2006 and of Orihuela-Alicante between 2006 and 2012.

He was infected with COVID-19 during the COVID-19 pandemic in Spain in January 2021 after an outbreak at the priests' residence in Alicante, from which he recovered, but it aggravated his cancer and he died on 8 March 2021.

References

1936 births
2021 deaths
21st-century Roman Catholic bishops in Spain
People from the Province of Zamora
University of Granada alumni
Bishops appointed by Pope John Paul II
Bishops appointed by Pope Benedict XVI
Deaths from the COVID-19 pandemic in Spain
Deaths from cancer in Spain